"Soirée disco" is a song by French DJ Philippe Dhondt under the pseudonym of Boris. It was released as the first single from his eponymous debut album in 1996. It achieved a success in France and Belgium's Wallonia region, topping their charts.

Background
The song's lyrics and music were composed by Bruno van Garsse, M. de San Antonio, Benoît Marissal, and Philippe Dhondt. The song was produced by van Garsse and Marissal, who had previously worked with the 1993 band GO Culture.

"Soirée disco" is a funny song in which the singer explains the disco party that he is organizing in his house.

Charts performances
In France, "Soirée disco" debuted on the French Singles Chart at number 43, topping the chart on 16 March, during its eighth week on the chart. It stayed in the top 50 for 24 weeks. The same year, the single was certified gold by the Syndicat National de l'Édition Phonographique (SNEP) for a minimum of sales of 250,000 and was ranked at number 11 on the SNEP year-end chart.

In the Wallonia region of Belgium, the single debuted at number 26 on 16 March 1996 and reached number two three weeks later. It remained at the position for two weeks, then peaked at number one for seven consecutive weeks. Like in France, the song spent 24 weeks on the Ultratop chart. It was the fourth best-selling single that year in the region.

Track listings
CD single
 "Soirée disco" (fais le beau mix)
 "Soirée disco" (la gentille radio mix) 
 "Soirée disco" (fais le beau mix)

CD maxi – Remixes
 "Soirée disco" (l'étoile mix) (4:52)
 "Boris et la fée" (6:41)
 "Soirée disco" (la fureur mix) (5:19)

12-inch maxi – Remixes
 "Soirée disco" (l'étoile mix) (4:52)
 "Boris et la fée" (6:41)
 "Soirée disco" (la fureur mix) (5:19)

12-inch maxi – Remixes
 "Soirée disco" (top délire méga groove) (5:18)
 "Soirée disco" (crazy mix) (5:18)
 "Boris et la Fée" (domme mix) (6:54)
 "La Danse des gros" (fat mix) (4:50)
			
12-inch maxi – Remixes
 "Soirée disco" (fais le beau mix) (6:00)
 "Soirée disco" (Boris l'genre de mec qui parle tout seul) (2:23)
 "Soirée disco" (fais le beau radio mix) (3:47)
 "Soirée disco" (top délire méga groove) (5:21)

Personnel
 Music : 
 "Soirée disco" : Bruno van Garsse, M. de San Antonio, Philippe Dhondt, Benoît Marissal
 "Boris et la Fée" : Bruno van Garsse, M. de San Antonio, Philippe Dhondt, J. Meurisse
 Mixed by Sébastien Darras and Jacky Meurisse at studios Black Out
 Produced by Bruno van Garsse and Philippe Dhondt
 Executive producer : Michel Nachtergaele for Black Out Records
 Editions : Nowdi Music / Sony Music Publishing

Charts

Weekly charts

Year-end charts

Certifications

References

1996 debut singles
1996 songs
Boris (singer) songs
SNEP Top Singles number-one singles
Ultratop 50 Singles (Wallonia) number-one singles